Abdulsalami Abubakar  (born 13 June 1942) is a Nigerian statesman and retired Nigerian army general who served as the de facto President of Nigeria from 1998 to 1999. He was also Chief of Defence Staff between 1997 and 1998. He succeeded General Sani Abacha upon his death.

During his leadership, Nigeria adopted a modified version of the 1979 constitution, which provided for multiparty elections. He transferred power to president-elect Olusegun Obasanjo on 29 May 1999. He is the current Chairman of the National Peace Committee.

Early life
Abubakar from the Hausa ethnicity was born on 13 June 1942 to his father Abubakar Jibrin and his mother Fatikande Mohammed, in Minna, Niger State, Nigeria.

From 1950 to 1956 he attended Minna Native Authority Primary school. From 1957 to 1962, he had his secondary school education at Government College, Bida, Niger State. From January to October 1963 he studied at Kaduna Technical College.

Military careers

Air force career
Abubakar is a member of the pioneering sets of officer cadets who enlisted into the Nigerian Air force on 3 October 1963. From 1964- 1966, he was flown to Uetersen, West Germany with a team of officer cadets, for Basic and Advance Military Training. When he returned to Nigeria in 1966 he was seconded to the Nigerian Army.

Career in the army
After joining the army in 1966 as an officer cadet, Abubakar attended the emergency combatant short service course two. In October 1967, Abubakar was commissioned second lieutenant, infantry division, Nigerian army. From 1967 to 1968, Abubakar was general staff officer two, second garrison, and commanding officer, 92 infantry battalion from 1969 to 1974. Between 1974 and 1975, he was made brigade major, 7th infantry brigade. In 1975 he served as commanding officer, 84 infantry battalion. In 1978–1979, Abubakar was commanding officer for the 145 infantry battalion (NIBATT II), United Nations Interim force, Lebanon.

In 1979 he was made assistant adjutant general 3rd Infantry division, Nigeria. From 1980 to 1982, Abubakar was chief instructor at the Nigerian Defence Academy. In 1982 he was appointed as the colonel of administration and quartering, 1st mechanised division. A position he held up until 1984. From 1985 to 1986, Abubakar was the commander 3rd mechanised brigade. He served as the military secretary of the army, 1986–1988. Abubakar was made general officer commanding 1st mechanised division 1990–1991. Between 1991 and 1993, he was the principal staff officer, as the army chief of plan and policy, Defence Headquarters.

From 1997 to 1998, General Sani Abacha appointed Abubakar as the Chief of Defence Staff. Upon Abacha's death on 8 June 1998, one day later Abubakar was named military President and Commander in Chief of the Armed Forces of the Federal Republic of Nigeria.

Presidency

Military 
Nigeria had been ruled by military leaders since Muhammadu Buhari seized power from Shehu Shagari in a 1983 coup.
Although democratic elections had been held in 1993, they were annulled by General Ibrahim Babangida. Reported to have had an initial reluctance to accepting the position, Abubakar was sworn in as president on 9 June 1998 after the unexpected death of Abacha. He declared a weeklong period of national mourning.

Politics 
A few days after assuming office, Abubakar promised to hold elections within a year and transfer power to an elected president.
He established the Independent National Electoral Commission (INEC), appointing former Supreme Court Justice Ephraim Akpata as chairman.
The INEC held a series of elections first for Local Government Areas in December 1998, then for State Assemblies and Governors, National Assemblies and finally for the President on 27 February 1999. Although efforts were made to ensure that the elections were free and fair, there were widespread irregularities that drew criticism from foreign observers.

Transfer of power 

Surprising some critics of the country's military, in May 1999 General Abubakar, handed over power to the newly elected civilian president, Olusegun Obasanjo and retired from the army.

Legacy
Abubakar's legacy is mixed. A lecture circuit at Chicago State University in Chicago, Illinois, United States featuring him encountered opposition, because he had supported Abacha's government. (Abacha's administration was notorious for its human rights abuses). He was also sued in that country by other Nigerians who claimed he was responsible for the death of 1993 president-elect Moshood Kashimawo Olawale Abiola, who died in custody after being prevented by the military from taking office, and for the violation of the rights of others during his administration. Abubakar helped in the Liberian peace movement by presiding over the 2003 peace talks between Charles Taylor and the opposing rebels. This is seen in the movie Pray the Devil Back to Hell. Abubakar also chaired the Commonwealth Observer Group to the Zimbabwe presidential election in 2002, which concluded that "the conditions in Zimbabwe did not adequately allow for a free expression of will by the electors."

Personal life
Abubakar is married to Fati and they have six children together.

Awards and honours

Abudulsalami Abubakar has received several awards and medals. In alphabetical order they include:

 Defence Service Medal (DSM)  
 Distinguished Service Medal (DSM)
 Forces Service Star (FSS) 
 General Service Medal (GSM) 
 Grand Commander of the Federal Republic of Nigeria (GCFR) 
 International Gold Medal, of the Economic Community of West African States
 Meritorious Service Star (MSS)
 National Service Medal (NSM) 
 Republic Medal (RM)
 Rainbow/Push Coalition Peace Prize
 Silver Jubilee Medal (SJM)
 Order of the Star of Ghana
 Ufuk Dialogue Peace Award 2022

Bibliography
 Abubakar, Abdulsalami. (1998) Nigeria: A new beginning. Publisher: Federal Ministry of Information and Culture. ASIN: B0006FDZZG

See also

 Nigerian Third Republic
 Nigerian Fourth Republic
List of Hausa people

References

External links
 Abdulsalami Abubakar – Famous Nigerians and personalities – OnlineNigeria.com

1942 births
Living people
People from Minna
Nigerian Muslims
Nigerian generals
Heads of state of Nigeria
Nigerian Air Force officers
Nigerian Army officers
Hausa people